Gazzard is a surname. Notable people with the surname include:

Carl Gazzard (born 1982), English cricketer
Gerry Gazzard (1925–2006), English footballer
Marea Gazzard (1928–2013), Australian sculptor and ceramicist

See also
Glazzard

English-language surnames